The CZW World Tag Team Championship is a professional wrestling world tag team championship owned and copyrighted by the Combat Zone Wrestling (CZW) promotion; it is contested for in their tag team division. It was created and debuted on February 13, 1999 at CZW's Opening Night event, where Jon Dahmer and Jose Rivera, Jr. were awarded the championship, becoming the inaugural champions in the process.

Overall, there have been 60 reigns, shared between 77 individual wrestlers and 44 teams, and four vacancies.

CMD (Desean Pratt & Boom Harden), are the current champions in their first reign.

History
On February 13, 1999, CZW debuted their version of a tag team championship, which they named the CZW World Tag Team Championship at the company's Opening Night event. Jon Dahmer and Jose Rivera, Jr. were awarded the championship at the said event, becoming the inaugural champions in the process.  Although the title is a world tag team championship, supposedly only intended for tag teams, a wrestler has held the championship by himself – Justice Pain. Pain held the championship during his entire reign alone, from November 20, 1999 to January 8, 2000, when he lost it to The Thrill Kill Kult (Diablos Macabre and Midknight); the same team he defeated to win the championship.

Reigns

The inaugural champions were Jon Dahmer and Jose Rivera, Jr., who were awarded the championship on February 13, 1999 at CZW's Opening Night event. At  days, The Backseat Boyz (Johnny Kashmere and Trent Acid)'s fourth reign is the longest in the title's history. Dahmer's and Rivera, Jr.'s only reign and 2 Girls, 1 Cup (Beef Wellington and Greg Excellent)'s first reign are tied for the record for the shortest in the title's history at less than one day. The Backseat Boyz hold the record for most reigns, with four. Scarlet And Graves (Dezmond Xavier and Zachary Wentz) are the current champions, who are in their first reign. They defeated EYFBO (Angel Ortiz  and Mike Draztik) on December 10, 2016, at CZW Cage Of Death 18 to win the titles. Overall, there have been 60 reigns, shared between 77 individual wrestlers and 44 teams, and four vacancies.

References
General

Specific

External links
CZW World Tag Team Championship reign history

Combat Zone Wrestling championships
Tag team wrestling championships